Song Ping (born 30 April 1917) is a Chinese Communist revolutionary and a retired high-ranking politician. He was a member of the Politburo Standing Committee of the Chinese Communist Party, which effectively rules China, and is considered the only living member of the Second Generation of Chinese Leadership.

Biography
He rose through the ranks of the party to become First Party Secretary of Gansu Province, and later Minister of Organization of CCP. Song was in charge of senior cadres' recommendation, candidacy and promotion.

During his time as Party Chief of Gansu, Song Ping became mentor of two young protégés - Hu Jintao and Wen Jiabao – who were to become the General Secretary of the  Chinese Communist Party and the Premier of the Chinese State Council, respectively.

In 1987, Song left the Planning Commission to replace Wei Jianxing as head of the CCP Central Organization Department. Song announced a decision by the Chinese Communist Party to expel members of the communist party who were sympathetic to pro-democracy demonstrations in the spring of 1989. After the Tiananmen Square protests, Song became a member of Politburo Standing Committee with Jiang Zemin and Li Ruihuan.

He stepped down as a member of the Politburo Standing Committee on 19 October 1992 after 14th Party Congress.

Song turned 100 in April 2017. Considered instrumental in the rise of former CCP general secretary Hu Jintao, he lately attended the 20th Party Congress at age 105.

References

1917 births
Living people
Chinese centenarians
Chinese Communist Party politicians from Shandong
Governors of Gansu
Members of the 13th Politburo Standing Committee of the Chinese Communist Party
Men centenarians
People's Republic of China politicians from Shandong
Politicians from Rizhao
Tsinghua University alumni
State councillors of China
Xinhua News Agency people